Calothyrza margaritifera is a species of beetle in the family Cerambycidae. It was described by John O. Westwood in 1848 in his "The Cabinet of Oriental Entomology" as Phryneta margaritifera.

Range

Its range has been recorded in literature from Myanmar, India, Thailand, and Nepal. The type locality is Nepal.

In India, it has been recorded in July 2009 from Pen, and subsequently a specimen collected in July 2018 from Chiplun, forming a new range extension to the Western Ghats and first properly documented collection of a specimen from India.

Description

Westwood (1848) describes the specimen as follows:

References

Phrynetini
Beetles described in 1848